Makrut may refer to:
 A sub-district (tambon) of Khok Pho district, Pattani, Thailand
 Kaffir lime, a variety of citrus fruit